American Justice is an American criminal justice television program airing on the A&E Network.  From 1992–2005, the show was hosted by television reporter Bill Kurtis. The show features interesting or notable cases, such as the murder of Selena, Scarsdale Diet doctor murder, the Hillside Stranglers, Matthew Shepard, and the Wells Fargo heist, with the stories told by key players, such as police, lawyers, victims, and the perpetrators themselves. More than 250 episodes were produced in the original series, making it the longest-running documentary justice show on cable.

The original series' final new episode aired on December 10, 2005.  A new version debuted on August 20, 2021, with actor Dennis Haysbert replacing Kurtis as narrator.

Episodes

Season 1

Season 2

Season 3

Season 4

Season 5

Season 6

Season 7
70  Payback for a Bully  : Murder of Bobby Kent
71  “It’s Not My Fault.”: Strange Defenses
72  Lethal Injection: The Hospital Murders
73  The Jonesboro Schoolyard Ambush
74  Sister against Sister: The Twin Murder Plot
75  Rape in Connecticut: The Alex Kelly Story
76  Duty, Honor...and Murder
77  A Parent's Nightmare
78  Death Row Radical: Mumia Abu-Jamal
79  Dancing, Drugs, & Murder
80  Blueprint for Murder
81  The Killer Within: Murder of Kathy Bonney
82  The Trial Of Louise Woodward
83  Getting Away With Murder
84  Deadly Magnolia
85  Kill Thy Neighbor: George Trepal
86  The Life and Death of Teena Brandon

Season 8
87  Oil, Money and Murder - The trials of Texas oilman T. Cullen Davis 
88  Free To Murder Again
89  The Wife Who Knew too Much
90  When a Child Kills
91  The California Killing Field
92  Murder on a Reservation
93  Dangerous Medicine?
94  A Son's Confession
95  Family Secret: The Death of Lisa Steinberg
96  Hiding In Plain Sight: Tales Of A Fugitive
97  A Mother On Death Row
98  The Erin Brockovich Story
99  The Boy Who Saw Too Much
100  The Atlanta Child Murders
101  Who Wants to Kill a Millionaire (The Ted Binion Silver Murder)
102  Shotgun Justice
103  Shattered Innocence: The Fells Acres Abuse Case
104  Raised On Hate
105  The Matthew Shepard Story

Season 9
106 Lying Eyes
107  Conspiracy to Kill: The Rae Carruth Story
108  Eliminating The Competition
109  Marijuana And Murder
110  Like Mother, Like Son: Sante and Kenny Kimes
111  The Girl In The Box
112  The Disappearance Of Madalyn Murray O'Hair
113  A Mother's Story Of Murder
114  Death In A Small Town (Alvin Ridley)
115  Millions Of Reasons To Kill
116  Driven To Kill
117  The Cult Murders
118  Brutal Revenge
119  An Execution in Doubt
120  Suicide By Execution
121  The Witness and the Hitman
122  While the Children Slept

Season 10
123  The Monster Inside
124  Vanished
125  Crib Death?
126 The Black Widow Of Vegas
127  In The Hands Of A Child
128  Who Killed Hannah Hill?
129  Justifiable Homicide?
130  A Questionable Doctor
131  A Mother's Betrayal
132  The Andrea Yates Story
133  A Murder before Homecoming (the murder of Heather Rich)
134  Shots in the Dark
135  Shamed into Confession
136  Mistaken Identity
137  Mail Order Murder
138  The Corcoran Eight
139  To Save Their Souls
140  What the Girl Saw
141  Murder Online
142  Mystery at Sea

Season 11
143  The San Francisco Dog Mauling
144  The Central Park Jogger Case: What Went Wrong?
145  The Wells Fargo Heist
146  Blood Brothers: The Derek and Alex King Case
147  The Yosemite Killer
148  Don't Mess with Texas
149  Another Man's Crime
150  Murder by Mercedes
151  For Love or Money
152  A Deadly Dose
153  Playing With Fire
154  The Happy Face Killer
155  Murder on the Boardwalk
156  The Case of Robert Blake
157  Traces in Blood
158  The Excedrin Killings
159  A Soldier's Secret
160  Daughter Dearest
161  Blood Relations

Season 12
162  Thrill Killers
163 Sins of a Priest: The John Geoghan Story
164 The Black Widower
165 Under Suspicion: The Case of Catherine Shelton
166  Stacey's Story
167  Murder in Paradise
168  Child's Play, Deadly Play
169  Murder & Mrs. B
170  The Wrath of Mrs. Jones
171  The Doctor's Wife
172  A Model Murder
173  Double Life, Double Murder
174  The Bully of Toulon
175  Love Triangle
176  Serial Wife
177  Who Whacked Zack?
178  Accused in Appalachia
179  The Brit and the Bodybuilder
180  Lies of a Friend
181  A Warrant to Kill

Season 13
182  Palm Beach Law
183  The Deer Hunting Murder
184  The Perfect Wife
185  What Happened to Carrie Culberson
186  A Confession in Question
187  The Scott Peterson Trial
188  Murder in the Court
189  Countdown to an Execution
190  Blood on the Staircase
191  The Bridge Murders
192  Hamptons Murder Mystery
193  The Brothers Kimble

Specials
Murder in a College Town
Special  Why O. J. Simpson Won
Special  The Rosenbergs
Special  Who Killed the Candy Heiress?: The Helen Brach Story
1600  Why O. J. Simpson Lost:: The Civil Trial
58930  Death in a Small Town
Special  Who Is the Lipstick Killer
65535  Vigilante Dad

References

External links 
 
 A&E's American Justice website

A&E (TV network) original programming
1992 American television series debuts
English-language television shows
2005 American television series endings
2021 American television series debuts